The Story of Louis Pasteur is a 1936 American black-and-white  biographical film from Warner Bros., produced by Henry Blanke, directed by William Dieterle, that stars Josephine Hutchinson, Anita Louise and Donald Woods, and Paul Muni as the renowned scientist who developed major advances in microbiology, which revolutionized agriculture and medicine. The film's screenplay—which tells a highly fictionalized version of Pasteur’s life—was written by Pierre Collings and Sheridan Gibney, and Edward Chodorov (uncredited).

Muni won an Academy Award for Best Actor, while Collings and Gibney won for Best Screenplay and Best Story. The film was nominated for Best Picture.

Muni also won the Volpi Cup for Best Actor from the Venice Film Festival in 1936.

Plot
In 1860 Paris, a distraught man murders his wife's doctor. Chemist Louis Pasteur (Paul Muni) has publicized the theory that microbes cause diseases. Therefore, doctors should avoid spreading by washing their hands and sterilizing their instruments in boiling water. The doctor did not do this, and the wife died of puerperal fever after giving birth.

France's medical academy dismisses Pasteur—notably his most vocal critic, Dr. Charbonnet (Fritz Leiber Sr.)—as a crank whose recommendations are tantamount to witchcraft. Pasteur frankly calls attention to the risks of Charbonnet's non-sterile methods and correctly predicts that a member of Napoleon III's royal family who Charbonnet is attending will die of puerperal fever. Pasteur is considered dangerous because his ideas have led to murder. When the Emperor comes down against him, Pasteur leaves Paris and moves to Arbois.

In the 1870s, when the new French government tries to restore the economy after the Franco-Prussian War, they learn that many sheep are dying of anthrax, except around Arbois. They send representatives who realize that, after working with a small group of loyal researchers, Pasteur developed an anthrax vaccine.

The medical academy still opposes him and says Arbois must be free of anthrax, so the government buys land there and invites sheep farmers to use it. Pasteur objects strongly, saying the soil is full of anthrax spores, and eventually proposes an experiment. He will vaccinate 25 of the newly arrived sheep; then they and a control group of 25 others will be injected with blood from a sheep with anthrax.

Joseph Lister (Halliwell Hobbes), the pioneer of antiseptic surgery in England, is interested enough to attend. He witnesses Pasteur's success as all the vaccinated sheep remain healthy after the other 25 die. At this point, Jean Martel (Donald Woods), a young doctor who was formerly Charbonnet's assistant but now follows Pasteur, becomes engaged to Pasteur's daughter Annette (Anita Louise).

The celebrations are short-lived, as a rabid dog runs through the town and bites a man. As a woman attempts to cure him by witchcraft, Pasteur laments that doctors would have no more chance of success. Moving back to Paris, he makes rabies his next project. He spreads the disease from one animal to another by injection but cannot detect any microbe being transferred (viruses had not been discovered), and the method he used to create the anthrax vaccine fails.

Charbonnet visits the lab to gloat over Pasteur's failure. He is so confident Pasteur is a quack that he injects himself with rabies—and is triumphant, as he does not get the disease. Pasteur is puzzled until his wife Marie (Josephine Hutchinson) suggests the sample may have weakened with age. This sets him on the right path, giving dogs progressively stronger injections.

But before his experiments conclude, a frantic mother begs him to try his untested treatment on her son (Dickie Moore), who a rabid dog has bitten. Despite fearing imprisonment or even execution for Practicing without a license to provide medical treatment, Pasteur decides he must try to save the child. During the attempt, Dr. Zaranoff (Akim Tamiroff) arrives from Russia with a group of peasants exposed to rabies. They have volunteered to receive Pasteur's treatment.

Annette goes into labor with Martel's child. The doctor to attend to her is unavailable, and the boy urgently needs Martel. Pasteur searches for another doctor, but he can only find Charbonnet. He begs Charbonnet to wash his hands and sterilize his instruments; Charbonnet finally agrees that if Charbonnet lives another month, Pasteur will retract and denounce all his work on rabies. Both men are honorable enough to respect the agreement. The birth goes well, but Pasteur suffers a mild stroke.

Days later, word comes that Pasteur has permission to treat the still-alive Russians. He attends them in hospital for the first injections using a wheelchair and later a cane. The experiment is a success, and now even Charbonnet concedes he was wrong, tearing up Pasteur's retraction and asking for the shots himself.

Afterwards, Pasteur hears that Lister will denounce him at the medical academy. He angrily attends, but it is actually a surprise. Lister praises him, Zaranoff presents him with a Russian medal, and the once-skeptical doctors honor him.

Cast
 Paul Muni as Louis Pasteur
 Josephine Hutchinson as Marie Pasteur
 Anita Louise as Annette Pasteur
 Donald Woods as Dr. Jean Martel
 Fritz Leiber as Dr. Charbonnet
 Henry O'Neill as Dr. Emile Roux
 Porter Hall as Dr. Rossignol
 Raymond Brown  as Dr. Radisse
 Akim Tamiroff as Dr. Zaranoff
 Halliwell Hobbes as Dr. Lister
 Frank Reicher as Dr. Pfeiffer
 Dickie Moore as Joseph Meister
 Ruth Robinson as Mrs. Meister
 Walter Kingsford as Napoleon III
 Iphigenie Castiglione as Empress Eugénie
 Herbert Corthell as Louis Adolphe Thiers, President of France
 Frank Mayo as Sadi Carnot (uncredited)
 Leonid Snegoff as Russian Ambassador (uncredited)
 Edward Van Sloan as Chairman of Medical Society (uncredited)

Reception and accolades
Writing for The Spectator in 1936, Graham Greene gave the film a good review, describing it as "an honest, interesting and well-made picture". Characterizing Paul Muni as "the greatest living actor" and as a "Protean figure", Greene asserts that Muni's depiction of Pasteur is accomplished "with his whole body [to establish] not only the bourgeois, the elderly, the stubborn and bitter and noble little chemist, but his nationality and even his period."

The film and lead character were nominated for two of the American Film Institute's lists:
 2003: AFI's 100 Years...100 Heroes & Villains:
 Louis Pasteur – Hero
 2006: AFI's 100 Years...100 Cheers

Radio adaptations
Paul Muni reprised his role in two radio play versions of the film: the November 23, 1936 episode of Lux Radio Theater and the April 13, 1946 episode of Academy Award Theater. The Internet Archive holds this radio adaptation, which can be found in the external links below.

References

External links
 
 
 
 
 
 The Story of Louis Pasteur at Virtual History
 The Internet Archive holds a radio adaptation of the film, originally broadcast on November 23, 1936 by Lux Radio Theater.

1936 films
1930s biographical films
American biographical films
American black-and-white films
Biographical films about scientists
Cultural depictions of Louis Pasteur
Films about infectious diseases
Films based on biographies
Films directed by William Dieterle
Films featuring a Best Actor Academy Award-winning performance
Films set in France
Films whose writer won the Best Adapted Screenplay Academy Award
First National Pictures films
Films that won the Academy Award for Best Story
Cultural depictions of Napoleon III
Warner Bros. films
1930s English-language films
1930s American films